Naran (also Romanized as Narān; also known as Narān Ḩasan Langī) is a village in Shamil Rural District, Takht District, Bandar Abbas County, Hormozgan Province, Iran. At the 2006 census, its population was 137, in 30 families.

References 

Populated places in Bandar Abbas County